A Hay Lot is a portion of common land used for haymaking and assigned by lot or allotment. Traditionally a marker, usually of stone, was used in early agriculture to mark the position of an individual hay lot within a hay meadow. The marker stone would typically bear the initials of the lot-holder. Such markers would have been common-place in meadows in Britain, but with the advent of modern farming many hay meadows were ploughed for arable crops, and the hay lots removed. Today, few such examples remain, but some can be seen in the North Meadow at Cricklade.

In modern agriculture a Hay lot is defined as the harvest of hay from a single field undertaken within a 48-hour period.

See also 
 Earsh
 Field
 Flood-meadow
 Grassland
 Meadow
 Pasture

References

Grasslands
Agricultural land